VFTS 102 is a star located in the Tarantula nebula, a star forming region in the  Large Magellanic Cloud, a satellite galaxy of the Milky Way.

The resulting centripetal force tends to flatten the star; material can be lost in the loosely bound equatorial regions, allowing for the formation of a disk. The spectroscopic observations seem to confirm this, and the star is classified as Oe, possibly due to emission from such an equatorial disk of gas.

This star was observed by the VLT Flames Tarantula Survey collaboration using the VLT, Very Large Telescope in Chile. One member of this team is Matteo Cantiello, an Italian astrophysicist who emigrated to the United States and is currently working at the Kavli Institute for Theoretical Physics at University of California Santa Barbara. In 2007, together with a few collaborators, he predicted the existence of massive stars with properties very similar to VFTS 102. In its theoretical model, the extreme rotational speed is caused by the transfer of material from a companion star in a binary system. After this "cosmic dance", the donor star is predicted to explode as a supernova. The spun-up companion instead is likely to be launched out of the orbit and move away from its stellar neighbors at high speed. Such a star is called a runaway.  VFTS 102 fits this theoretical model very well, being found to be a rapidly rotating runaway star and lying close to a pulsar and a supernova remnant. Other scenarios, like a dynamical ejection from the core of the star cluster R136, are also possible.

References

External links
 ESO Press Release
 STScI Press Release
 News on "Corriere della Sera"
 News on "Il Tirreno"
 Press Release at University of California Santa Barbara
 VLT Flames Tarantuala Survey Homepage
 Matteo Cantiello HomePage

O-type main-sequence stars
Emission-line stars
Runaway stars
Tarantula Nebula
Stars in the Large Magellanic Cloud
Extragalactic stars
Dorado (constellation)
J05373924-6909510